Henry Emehel Chinedu  (born 1 January 1986), is a Nigerian actor and entrepreneur.He is best known for his role in the film  The Face of an Angel .

Personal life
He was born on 1 January 1986 in Enugu, Nigeria.He grew up at Enugu and attended Agbani Road Primary and secondary school at Uwani Secondary School.

Career
Chinedu acting career began with local drama productions in Lagos. His first feature film role was in the movie Queen's Heart.His maiden international appearance came through BBC Films The Face of an Angel, directed by Michael Winterbottom and produced by Melissa Parmenter.In the film, he played a role as  'Cedric Bapupa'.

Filmography

References

External links
 Henry Emehel Chinedu Biography on IMDb
 
 Henry Emehel Chinedu: Filmreporter

1986 births
Living people
Nigerian male film actors
21st-century Nigerian male actors
Male actors from Enugu State
Actors from Enugu State
Igbo actors
African actors